The National Labour Party was a liberal party created in September 1925 in Czechoslovakia.  It was created from the split of the left-liberal part of Czechoslovak National Democracy. Central personalities of the party were Jan Herben and party chairman Jaroslav Stránský.
In 1925 parliamentary elections party got only 1.38% of the votes. Since 1926, the party cooperated with, and in 1930 merged with the Czechoslovak National Socialist Party.

The party was supported by public figures like Karel Čapek and Ferdinand Peroutka.

See also
History of Czechoslovakia

References

Political parties in Czechoslovakia
1925 establishments in Czechoslovakia
1930 disestablishments in Czechoslovakia
Political parties established in 1925
Political parties disestablished in 1930
Labour parties